NGC 449 is a spiral galaxy of type (R')S? located in the constellation Pisces. It was discovered on November 11, 1881 by Édouard Stephan. It was described by Dreyer as "very faint, very small, round, very little brighter middle, very faint star involved."

References

External links
 

0449
18811111
Pisces (constellation)
Spiral galaxies
4587